The 2022 Open ITF Arcadis Brezo Osuna was a professional tennis tournament played on outdoor hard courts. It was the eighth edition of the tournament which was part of the 2022 ITF Women's World Tennis Tour. It took place in Madrid, Spain between 13 and 19 June 2022.

Champions

Singles

  Marina Bassols Ribera def.  Alex Eala, 6–4, 7–5

Doubles

  Anna Danilina /  Anastasia Tikhonova def.  Lu Jiajing /  You Xiaodi, 6–4, 6–2

Singles main draw entrants

Seeds

 1 Rankings are as of 6 June 2022.

Other entrants
The following players received wildcards into the singles main draw:
  Ainhoa Atucha Gómez
  Lucía Cortez Llorca
  Carolina Gómez
  Ariana Geerlings
  Lidia Moreno Arias

The following player received entry into the singles main draw using a protected ranking:
  Ivana Popovic

The following players received entry from the qualifying draw:
  Mana Ayukawa
  Marta González Encinas
  Kathleen Kanev
  Lia Karatancheva
  Yasmine Mansouri
  Sofia Milatová
  Alana Parnaby
  Marine Szostak

References

External links
 2022 Open ITF Arcadis Brezo Osuna at ITFtennis.com
 Official website

2022 ITF Women's World Tennis Tour
2022 in Spanish tennis
June 2022 sports events in Spain